The Aberdeen and NE Scotland Music festival is a week-long annual traditional music festival in Aberdeen, Scotland, UK. The festival was created 1n 1909 by Professor Stanford Terry, to encourage music making and performance in the north east of Scotland. It was attended that year by well-known composer Sir Edward Elgar.

The motto of the festival, "Not to gain a prize or defeat a rival but to pace one another on the road to excellence" continues to be relevant today.

The festival is entirely run by volunteers and relies on  entry fees, legacies and sponsorship to continue to offer performance opportunities to musicians, singers and actors from the area.  The festival includes both competitions and concerts.

The festival has taken place at several venues, including Cowdray Hall, Queen’s Cross Church, Aberdeen Music Hall, The Citadel, St. Mark’s Church and the Boys' Brigade Hall.

2013 

About 2400 people attended the 2013 festival.

References

External links 

 

Music festivals in Scotland
Culture in Aberdeen
Annual events in Scotland
1909 establishments in Scotland
Music festivals established in 1909